Atriplex lanfrancoi is a species of plant in the family Amaranthaceae. It is endemic to Malta and is listed as endangered by IUCN.

Sources

References 

lanfrancoi
IUCN Red List endangered species
Flora of Malta